WQMG (97.1 FM) is an urban adult contemporary station licensed to Greensboro, North Carolina and serves the Piedmont Triad region, which also includes High Point and Winston-Salem. The Audacy, Inc. outlet broadcasts with an ERP of 100 kW.  The station's studios are located near the Piedmont Triad International Airport, and a transmitter site is in unincorporated south Guilford County.

As of December 2021, WQMG is the highest-rated station in the Greensboro–Winston-Salem–High Point radio market.

History
The earliest roots of this station date to 1948 and a station with the call letters WFMY on 97.3 MHz, owned by the Greensboro News Company, publishers of the Greensboro Daily News and Daily Record (now merged as the Greensboro News & Record).  One year after its founding as an FM station, its owners constructed WFMY-TV, the first television station in Greensboro and the second in North Carolina.

The FM station was taken off the air in 1953 as the company devoted more of its resources to television.  A new station signed on under new ownership in 1962 on 97.1 MHz with the call letters WQMG, which stood for "Where Quality Music lives in Greensboro." With its new 20,000 watt facility the station was the first in the southeast to broadcast in stereo. In the early 1970s, WQMG aired an adult contemporary format known as "Stereo Island."

WQMG was very successful in the 1970s and 1980s as an Urban Contemporary format under the name "Power 97 FM". By 1996, they would move to their current format under the "Classic Soul...Smooth R&B" slogan, after becoming the sister station to WJMH and beating that station in the ratings, as well as WTQR with the 18-54 audience. Following the format change of competitor WMKS, WQMG is now the sole Adult R&B station in the market. From March 1997 to 2015, WQMG was the Triad's home of the syndicated Tom Joyner Morning Show. Shilynne Cole and Busta Brown now host a local morning show, and Renee Vaughn, who was a local host during Joyner's show, moved to middays. The Steve Harvey Morning Show replaced Tom Joyner on November 9, 2015.

In November–December 2021, WQMG achieved a rating of 13.0, the largest share in the history of the station.

References

External links

QMG
Urban adult contemporary radio stations in the United States
Audacy, Inc. radio stations